Andrés Perelló de Segurola (27 March 1874 – 23 January 1953) was a Spanish operatic bass.

Biography
He was born on 27 March 1874 in Valencia, Spain.

He was a member of the Metropolitan Opera Company between 1901 and 1920 and later appeared in many films. He appeared as himself in the 1928 romantic comedy film The Cardboard Lover.

Towards the end of his career at the Metropolitan Opera, De Segurola also became an impresario. In 1916, he presented a four-week opera season at the Grand National Theatre in Havana, where his company included Geraldine Farrar and Pasquale Amato.

After his retirement from the stage, he taught singing. Amongst his many pupils was Deanna Durbin.

He married Mrs. John Bidlake in 1936.

He died on 23 January 1953 in Barcelona, Spain.

Roles created 
Jake Wallace in La fanciulla del West (Giacomo Puccini), Metropolitan Opera, 10 December 1910
Didier in Madeleine (Victor Herbert), Metropolitan Opera, 24 January 1914
Fouché in Madame Sans-Gêne (Umberto Giordano), Metropolitan Opera, 25 January 1915
Ser Amantio di Nicolao in Gianni Schicchi (Giacomo Puccini), Metropolitan Opera, 14 December 1918

Partial filmography
 The Flaming Omen (1917)
 The Love of Sunya (1927)
 Bringing Up Father (1928)
 Glorious Betsy (1928)
 The Cardboard Lover (1928)
 The Red Dance (1928)
 My Man (1928)
 The Diplomats (1929 short)
 General Crack (1929)
 Mamba (1930)
 La Voluntad del muerto (1930)
 We're Rich Again (1934)
 One Night of Love (1934)
 Public Opinion (1935)
 Castillos en el aire  (1938)

References

Further reading
Mengíbar, Andrés Moreno, "El mundo de la ópera a través de un monóculo: Andrés Perelló de Segurola", Melómano, Orfeo Ediciones, S.L. Accessed 31 October 2009 (in Spanish).  
Metropolitan Opera, De Segurola, Andrés (Bass), performance record on the MetOpera Database. Accessed 31 October 2009.
Sauners,  Richard Drake (ed.), Music and Dance in California and the West, Read Books, 1940. 
Time, "A Night at the Opera", October 3, 1949. Accessed 31 October 2009.
Through My Monocle: Memoirs of the great basso Andreas de Segurola, edited by George R Creegan, Steubenville, Ohio: Crest Publishing Co., 1991.

External links

Audio files on the Internet Archive

20th-century Spanish male opera singers
Operatic basses
1874 births
1953 deaths
Singers from the Valencian Community
People from Valencia
Voice teachers
Spanish male film actors
Actors from the Valencian Community
20th-century Spanish male actors